Giacomo Brogi (6 April 1822 – 29 November 1881) was an Italian photographer.

Giacomo Brogi created his first studio in Corso Tintori, in Florence in 1864. He began traveling around Italy and later traveled to the Middle East in 1868 including Palestine, Egypt and Syria. 
Brogi was associated with the Photographic Society of Italy.
The factory was located on the Lungarno delle Grazie, 15, in Florence.
There were shops located:
 Florence. Via Tornabuoni 1.
 Naples. Via Chiatamone 19 bis.
 Rome. Via del Corso 419.
After death, his son Carlo continued his photographic work.

Further reading
"Catalogo delle fotografie pubblicate dalla ditta Giacomo Brogi, fotografo editore. Italia settentrionale: pitture, vedute, sculture, etc." Firenze: Brogi, 1926.
"Catalogo delle fotografie pubblicate da Giacomo Brogi. Pitture, vedute, sculture, ecc. Napoli e Campania. Roma e Lazio. Sicilia, Bologna, Rimini, etc." Firenze: 1912

Brogi Giacomo own book of hours was found in London 1987 600 gilt pages from Florence,

External links
Union List of Artists Names, s.v. "Brogi, Giacomo", cited 7 February 2006
George Eastman House Images
Images of Italy by Brogi
Art Courtauld information about Brogi

1822 births
1881 deaths
Photographers from Florence
Pioneers of photography
Architectural photographers